The 2016 São Tomé and Principe Championship was the 31st season of the São Tomé and Principe Championship the top-level football championship of São Tomé and Principe. It began on 21 May, a day earlier than last season and concluded on 21 December.  Two national final matches occurred in the season.  Sporting Praia Cruz from São Tomé island won their seventh and recent title.

Teams
38 teams participated in the São Tomé and Principe Championship, 32 from São Tomé Island (12 in the Premier Division, 10 in the lower two divisions) and 6 from Príncipe Island.  Only two clubs were absent which would total 40. At the end of season champion of São Tomé Island League and champion of Principe Island League play one match for champion of São Tomé and Principe.

São Tomé teams 2016

Premier Division

Second Division

Third Division

Principe teams 2016

Six clubs took part in the 2016 season.  Sporting Príncipe won the title again and participated in the national championship match in December.  The season started on 10 June and finished on 20 November. A total of 222 goals were scored.

Final table

Statistics
Highest scoring match: FC Porto Real 8 - 1 1º de Maio

National final
Two national final matches took place on December 14 and 20 at noon. Once again, it was another "Sporting" competition as the match featured Sporting Príncipe from Príncipe and Sporting Praia Cruz from São Tome Island.  The matches took place later than the previous season.  Unusual, like in North American leagues, the club played at the stadium of the last listed club instead of the first listed.

Sporting Praia Cruz won the first leg 2-1 while a two goal draw were made by two clubs.  With a total of four goals scored, Sporting Praia Cruz would go on the win their eight and recent national title, also it was their second straight.

Neither clubs participated into the 2017 CAF Champions League.

References

Football competitions in São Tomé and Príncipe
Sao
Championship